Erica Tremblay (born 1980) is a Seneca–Cayuga American documentary film director, based out of New York City known for her films In the Turn (2014), Heartland: A Portrait of Survival (2012) and Tiny Red Universe (2007) as well as her feature film directorial debut Fancy Dance (2023).

Early life and career 
Tremblay grew up in Seneca, Missouri, a rural community near Joplin, Missouri. In 2007, she moved to Lincoln, Nebraska. While there she wrote, produced and starred in Tiny Red Universe, a short film which aired on IFC.

In 2012, she released Heartland: A Portrait of Survival. The film documents the effects of the 2011 Joplin tornado which destroyed a quarter of the city and caused about $2.8 billion worth of damage. Tremblay, who was living in Los Angeles at the time but had previously lived in Joplin, had relatives still living in her hometown. She traveled to the town with a film crew and documented the aftermath for a four-week period. The film, which features several stories like the Joplin Found Photos project, was shown at the Omaha Film Festival, and at St. Louis International Film Festival.

In 2014, Tremblay released In the Turn, a documentary film that revolves around a ten-year-old transgender girl from Timmins, Ontario. The film began as a Kickstarter project to profile the Vagine Regime, "a queer roller derby collective," in a documentary film. Tremblay received a message from Crystal's mother that recounted the negative experiences her daughter has had in asserting her gender identity and how she is unable to participate inn sports because of this. Tremblay, who herself identifies as queer, decided to refocus the documentary around Crystal.

In 2016, Tremblay was awarded a National Artist Fellowship at the Native Arts and Cultures Foundation. As of March, 2017, Tremblay serves as Bustle's director of video; before joining Bustle, she worked for Hearst Digital Media.

In 2023, Tremblay made her feature directorial debut with the drama film Fancy Dance, which premiered at the 2023 Sundance Film Festival, and was made possible in part by the Cherokee Nation film initiative.

References 

American documentary film directors
Film directors from Missouri
Film producers from Missouri
American documentary film producers
American film producers
American women documentary filmmakers
1980 births
Living people
People from Seneca, Missouri
Place of birth missing (living people)
21st-century American women
Seneca–Cayuga Nation